Republic Airlines was an American airline formed by the merger of North Central Airlines and Southern Airways on July 1, 1979. Their headquarters were at Minneapolis-St. Paul International Airport, in what is now Fort Snelling in unincorporated Hennepin County, Minnesota. The former headquarters is now Delta Air Lines Building C.  Republic was acquired by and merged into Northwest Airlines in 1986.

History

Republic Airlines began in 1979 with the merger of North Central Airlines and Southern Airways, the first such merger following the federal Airline Deregulation Act. The new airline's headquarters were at Minneapolis-Saint Paul International Airport, though their largest hub was at Detroit Metropolitan Wayne County Airport. Following their buyout of Hughes Airwest in 1980, Republic became the largest airline in the U.S. by number of airports served.

The company operated the world's largest McDonnell Douglas DC-9 fleet, with DC-9-10, DC-9-30 and DC-9-50s and also flew Boeing 727-200, Boeing 757-200, and McDonnell Douglas MD-80 jets. In addition, Republic operated Convair 580 turboprops previously flown by North Central.

After the merger, losses mounted and service reductions followed. Saddled with debt from two acquisitions and new aircraft, the airline struggled in the early 1980s, and even introduced a human mascot version of Herman the Duck. They reduced service to Phoenix, a former hub of Hughes Airwest, citing their inability to compete with non-union airlines there and eventually dismantled the former extensive route system operated by Hughes Airwest in the western U.S.

In early 1985 Republic teamed up with Simmons Airlines and Express Airlines I to provide feeder service from dozens of smaller cities to Republic's three main hub airports at Detroit, Memphis, and Minneapolis. The service was known as Republic Express using turboprop aircraft that were painted as Republic Airlines, accommodating from 14 to 34 passengers.

Northwest Airlines
In 1986, Northwest Orient Airlines announced on January 23 that they would buy Republic for $884 million in response to United Airlines' purchase of the Pacific routes of Pan American World Airways and to provide domestic feed. Opposed by the Justice Department, the Northwest-Republic merger was approved by the Transportation Department on July 31 and was completed on October 1, with Northwest dropping the word Orient from their name after the merger.  Republic's hubs at Minneapolis, Memphis, and Detroit became the backbone of Northwest's domestic network.

Northwest later merged with Delta Air Lines in 2008; the deal was finalized in January 2010, with Delta as the surviving air carrier. Republic's hubs in Detroit and the Twin Cities have remained intact with Delta; Memphis was dehubbed in 2013.

Frequent flyer program
In October 1984 Republic introduced a new frequent flyer program called the Perks program. The new program eliminated the need to place a frequent flyer account number sticker on each flight ticket coupon, with earned mileage automatically being assigned to accounts if the reservation was booked directly with Republic. Each flight segment earned a minimum of 1,000 miles or the actual mileage, if greater. A domestic round trip reward ticket was automatically issued every 20,000 miles. The new program included a partnership with Pan American World Airways for earning and redeeming mileage awards. In January 1986, Western Airlines was added as a partner. Effective October 1, 1986, the Republic Perks frequent flyer program was merged into Northwest Airlines which adopted the WorldPerks program name, taken from Republic.

Fleet

133 Douglas DC-9-14; Douglas DC-9-15; McDonnell Douglas DC-9-31; McDonnell Douglas DC-9-32; McDonnell Douglas DC-9-51
22 Boeing 727-200
8  McDonnell Douglas MD-82
6  Boeing 757-200
24  Convair CV-580 turboprop aircraft

Destinations in 1986

According to the Republic Airlines system route map dated March 2, 1986, the airline was serving the following domestic and international destinations shortly before the merger with Northwest Airlines:

Domestic

Alabama
 Birmingham
 Huntsville/Decatur
 Mobile
 Montgomery

Arizona
 Phoenix  (previously a hub immediately following the acquisition of Hughes Airwest in 1980)  – Phoenix Sky Harbor International Airport
 Tucson

Arkansas
 Little Rock

California
 Los Angeles — Los Angeles International Airport (previously a hub immediately following the acquisition of Hughes Airwest in 1980) 
 Orange County (SNA, now John Wayne Airport)
 Sacramento
 San Diego
 San Francisco — San Francisco International Airport (previously a hub immediately following the acquisition of Hughes Airwest in 1980) 

Colorado
 Denver — Stapleton International Airport

Connecticut
 Hartford — Bradley International Airport

Florida
 Fort Lauderdale
 Fort Walton Beach
 Miami
 Orlando (previously a focus city immediately following the merger of North Central Airlines and Southern Airways in 1979)  – Orlando International Airport 
 Panama City
 Sarasota
 Tampa

Georgia
 Atlanta — Hartsfield–Jackson Atlanta International Airport (previously a hub immediately following the merger of North Central Airlines and Southern Airways in 1979 but no longer a hub in 1986) 

Illinois
 Chicago — O'Hare International Airport (previously a hub immediately following the merger of North Central Airlines and Southern Airways in 1979) 

Indiana
 Fort Wayne
 Indianapolis
 South Bend

Iowa
 Cedar Rapids
 Des Moines

Kansas
 Wichita — Wichita Dwight D. Eisenhower National Airport

Kentucky
 Louisville

Louisiana
 Baton Rouge
 New Orleans (previously a focus city immediately following the merger of North Central Airlines and Southern Airways in 1979)  – Louis Armstrong New Orleans International Airport
 Shreveport

Maryland
 Baltimore

Massachusetts
 Boston — Logan International Airport

Michigan
 Detroit — Detroit Metropolitan Wayne County Airport - Hub
 Grand Rapids
 Kalamazoo
 Lansing
 Saginaw

Minnesota
 Duluth
 Hibbing
 International Falls
 Minneapolis — Minneapolis–Saint Paul International Airport - Hub & airline headquarters
 Rochester

Mississippi
 Gulfport/Biloxi
 Meridian
 Pascagoula - served via Mobile, AL

Missouri
 Kansas City
 Saint Louis

Nebraska
 Omaha

Nevada
 Las Vegas — McCarran International Airport (previously a hub immediately following the acquisition of Hughes Airwest in 1980) 

New York
 Albany
 Buffalo
 New York City — John F. Kennedy International Airport / LaGuardia Airport
 Rochester
 Syracuse
 White Plains

North Dakota
 Bismarck
 Fargo
 Grand Forks
 Minot

Ohio
 Akron/Canton
 Cincinnati — Cincinnati/Northern Kentucky International Airport
 Cleveland — Cleveland Hopkins International Airport
 Columbus
 Dayton

Oklahoma
 Oklahoma City
 Tulsa

Oregon
 Portland

Pennsylvania
 Erie
 Philadelphia
 Pittsburgh

South Dakota
 Rapid City
 Sioux Falls

Tennessee
 Chattanooga
 Knoxville
 Memphis — Memphis International Airport - Hub
 Nashville

Texas
 Dallas — Dallas/Fort Worth International Airport
 Houston — William P. Hobby Airport / George Bush Intercontinental Airport

Utah
 Salt Lake City — Salt Lake City International Airport (previously a focus city immediately following the acquisition of Hughes Airwest in 1980)  

Washington, D.C. / Virginia
 Washington Dulles International Airport
 Ronald Reagan Washington National Airport

Washington state
 Seattle — Seattle–Tacoma International Airport (previously a hub immediately following the acquisition of Hughes Airwest in 1980) 

Wisconsin
 Appleton
 Eau Claire
 Green Bay
 La Crosse
 Madison
 Milwaukee (previously a focus city immediately following the merger of North Central Airlines and Southern Airways in 1979) – General Mitchell International Airport
 Wausau

International

Canada
 Calgary, Alberta — Calgary International Airport
 Edmonton, Alberta — Edmonton International Airport
 Montreal, Quebec — Montreal–Pierre Elliott Trudeau International Airport
 Toronto, Ontario — Toronto Pearson International Airport
 Winnipeg, Manitoba — Winnipeg James Armstrong Richardson International Airport

Cayman Islands
 Grand Cayman

Mexico
 Cancun
 Puerto Vallarta
 Mazatlan
 Guadalajara

Incident
The airline had a high safety rating, but incurred a passenger fatality in 1983 when a section of propeller blade entered the cabin of Flight 927 at Brainerd, Minnesota on Sunday, January 9. Arriving from Minneapolis in sleet and snow showers at 7:40 p.m., the Convair 580 skidded off the right edge of the runway and the right propeller struck a snowbank. Three other passengers were injured, one seriously. Following this incident, the airline had a number of close calls in 1983.

See also 
 List of defunct airlines of the United States
 Revenue Technology Services (1982)

References

External links

Fleet and code information
Fleet information
Republic Airlines historical artifacts - inventory list of items stored at the Minnesota Historical Society
Aviation Safety Network – Republic Airlines

Airlines established in 1979
Airlines disestablished in 1986
Defunct airlines of the United States
Northwest Airlines
Defunct companies based in Minnesota
1979 establishments in Minnesota
1986 disestablishments in Minnesota
1986 mergers and acquisitions